Highway 778 is a provincial highway in the Canadian province of Saskatchewan. It runs from Highway 20 at Crystal Springs to Highway 6 near Lenvale.

Highway 778 passes through Kinistino.

See also 
Roads in Saskatchewan
Transportation in Saskatchewan

References 

778